, formerly known as , is a Japanese rakugoka, tarento and voice actor. He is an associate professor of humanities at Josai International University. He is the son of Hayashiya Sanpei I.

Filmography

Films
Tokyo Family (2013)
What a Wonderful Family! (2016)
What a Wonderful Family! 2 (2017)
What a Wonderful Family! 3: My Wife, My Life (2018)
The Day's Organ (2019)
The Lone Ume Tree (2021)

TV dramas
Sasurai Keiji Ryojōhen (xxxx)
Seibu Keisatsu (xxxx)
Ishikawa Goemon (2016) – Tokugawa Ieyasu
Segodon (2018) – Ōmura Masujirō

Anime
Anpanman (xxxx) (Hayashi Riceman)
Hiatari Ryōkō! (xxxx) (Takashi Ariyama)
Kochira Katsushika-ku Kameari Kōen-mae Hashutsujo (xxxx) (Yōichi Terai)
Oishinbo (xxxx) (Kichijō Kairakutei)
Sekai Dōbutsubanashi Tao Tao Ehonkan (xxxx)
Super Doll★Licca-chan (xxxx) (Wire)
Ton Ton Atta to: Niigata no Mukashibanashi (xxxx) (narrator, all male characters)
Touch (xxxx) (Kōtarō Matsudaira)
Pom Poko (xxxx) (Ponkichi)

Commercials
Niki Golf
U-Can (narrator)
Ishinoya, Inc.

Variety shows
Anzen Patrol
Hayashiya Shōzō no Tokyo Michi Tankentai
Hotchpotch Station
Kiseki no Tobira: TV no Chikara
Mogu Mogu GOMBO
Morita Kazuyoshi Hour Waratte Ii tomo!
Tensai Quiz
TV Tanteidan

Radio
Hayashiya Shōzō no Sengaku Banrai
Hayashiya Shōzō no Sunday University
Kuru Kuru Dial the Gorilla
Teyandi! Kobu JA de Dōdi

References

External links
Kura no Anbai: Hayashiya Shōzō Official Site (in Japanese)
Hatena Diary (in Japanese)
 
 

1962 births
Living people
Japanese male voice actors
Comedians from Tokyo
Male actors from Tokyo
Rakugoka
21st-century Japanese male actors